William the Good (– 7 June 1337) was count of Hainaut (as William I), Avesnes, Holland (as William III), and Zeeland (as William II) from 1304 to his death.

Career
William, born , was the son of John II, Count of Hainaut, and Philippa, daughter of Henry V, Count of Luxembourg. He was the brother of John of Beaumont and Alice of Hainault.

William was originally not expected to become count. After the deaths of his elder brothers, John (killed at Kortrijk in 1302) and Henry (d. 1303), he became heir apparent to his father's counties.

Prior to becoming count, he was defeated by Guy of Namur at the battle on the island of Duiveland in 1304. Guy and Duke John II of Brabant then conquered most of Zeeland and Holland, but these territories were recovered again when William became the new count in the same year. William continued the war with Flanders until the Peace of Paris in 1323, during which the Count of Flanders renounced all claims on Zeeland. William, in turn, gained all of Zeeland but agreed to renounce all claims on Imperial Flanders. William had occupied most of the Bishopric of Utrecht and tried to conquer Friesland but was repelled by Hessel Martena. At the death of his uncle, Guy d'Avesnes, Bishop of Utrecht, William took his fief of Amsterdam and annexed it to Holland.

Many of his daughters married with important rulers of Europe; King Edward III of England and Holy Roman Emperor Louis IV were married to his daughters, while he was married to the sister of the King Philip VI of France. With these important alliances William gained considerable influence and respect, which he used to advance the interests of his counties.

Family

On 19 May 1305 William married Joan of Valois, sister of the future king Philip VI of France, and had the following children:
William II, Count of Hainaut (1307–1345)
John (died 1316)
Margaret II, Countess of Hainault (1311–1356), married Louis IV, Holy Roman Emperor
Philippa of Hainault (c.1313–1369), married King Edward III of England
Agnes (died 1327)
Joanna of Hainaut (1315–1374), married William V, Duke of Jülich
Isabelle of Hainaut (1323–1361), married Robert of Namur
Louis (1325–1328)
Jan Aelman (1320–1389) Illegitimate son and Knight

Ancestors

See also
 Counts of Hainaut family tree
 Counts of Holland family tree

References

Further reading

Avesnes family
Counts of Holland
Counts of Hainaut
1286 births
1337 deaths
13th-century people of the Holy Roman Empire
14th-century people of the Holy Roman Empire